Kudelino is a rural locality (a village) in Rozhdestvenskoye Rural Settlement, Sobinsky District, Vladimir Oblast, Russia. The locality's population was 3 as of 2010.

Geography 
Kudelino is located on the Vorsha River, 33 km northwest of Sobinka (the district's administrative centre) by road. Demikhovo is the nearest rural locality.

References 

Rural localities in Sobinsky District